Benjamin Shaw (c 1770 – 6 November 1843) was an English politician.

He was elected at the 1812 general election as a Member of Parliament (MP) for the rotten borough of Westbury in Wiltshire, but was not re-elected in 1818.

References

External links 
 

1770 births
Year of birth uncertain
1843 deaths
Members of the Parliament of the United Kingdom for English constituencies
UK MPs 1812–1818